= Moscow Scientific-Research Television Institute =

Soviet-Russian research institute

Moscow Scientific-Research Television Institute (MNITI) (Russian: Московский научно-исследовательский телевизионный институт) is a leading institute in Russia that deals with research and development of broadcasting technologies. The institute was developed following a resolution by the Russian government on March 4, 1950.
